Pierre Vachon (3 June 1738 – 7 October 1803) was a French composer.

Vachon was born in Avignon, France.  He wrote around thirty string quartets, various chamber works, operas, and orchestral pieces. He studied the violin with Carlo Chiabrano in Paris and first performed on 24 December 1756, at the Concert Spirituel, playing one of his own compositions. He also performed as first violinist in the orchestra of the Prince of Conti.  He died in Berlin at the age of 65.

Selected works
Op. 1, 6 sonatas for violin and basso continuo 
Op. 4, 6 trios for two violins and basso continuo 
Op. 5 (c. 1775), 6 string quartets 
In A major
In G minor
In F minor
In B-flat major
In A major
In E-flat major
Op. 6 (1776?), 6 string quartets, published in London, different from the 1773 op. 6
 -
 -
 -
 -
 -
In D major
Op. 7 (1773), 6 string quartets 
In F major
In D major
In E-flat major
In B-flat major
In D minor
In C minor
Op. 9 (1774), 6 string quartets (lost)
Op. 11 (1782), 6 string quartets
In A major
In E major
In G major
In B major
In F minor
In C minor
Opera: Renaud D'Ast (Comedy in two acts mixed with ariettes. Premiered 12 October 1765) 
Opera: Les femmes et le secret (9 November 1767) 
Opera: Sara, La fermière écossaise (in two acts) (8 May 1773)

References

External links
musicologie.org Biography, works, bibliography 

1738 births
1803 deaths
18th-century French musicians
French classical composers
French male classical composers
French opera composers
Male opera composers
String quartet composers
Musicians from Avignon